The women's 200 metres at the 2018 Commonwealth Games, as part of the athletics programme, took place in the Carrara Stadium between 10 and 12 April 2018.

Records
Prior to this competition, the existing world and Games records were as follows:

Schedule
The schedule was as follows:

All times are Australian Eastern Standard Time (UTC+10)

Results

First round
The first round consisted of five heats. The four fastest competitors per heat (plus four fastest losers) advanced to the semifinals.

Heat 1

Heat 2

Heat 3

Heat 4

Heat 5

Semifinals
Three semi-finals were held. The two fastest competitors per semi (plus two fastest losers) advanced to the final.

Semifinal 1

Semifinal 2

Semifinal 3

Final
The medals were determined in the final.

References

Women's 200 metres
2018
2018 in women's athletics